The Dar es Salaam Stock Exchange (DSE) is a stock exchange located on Ohio Street, west of Kivukoni, south east of Dar es Salaam, the commercial capital and largest city in Tanzania. It was incorporated in September 1996 and trading started in April 1998. It is a member of the African Stock Exchanges Association and the World Federation of Exchanges. The exchange is open five days a week, from Monday through Friday. The trading days are weekly from Monday to Friday, starting from 10.00 am to 14.00 pm.

The activities of the exchange are monitored and supervised by the Capital Markets and Securities Authority (CMSA). The DSE operates in close association with the Nairobi Securities Exchange in Kenya and the Uganda Securities Exchange in Uganda. Plans are underway to integrate the three to form a single East African bourse.

History

Incorporation
The Dar es Salaam Stock Exchange was established by the capital markets and security authority under the Capital Markets and Securities (CMS) Act of 1994 in Dar-es-salaam, Tanzania. The stock exchange was incorporated on 19 September 1996. The company was incorporated as a private company limited by guarantee and not having a share capital under the Companies Ordinate, therefore the DSE is a non-profit making body.

The exchange became operational on 15 April 1998 with TOL Gas Limited listing as the first company followed by the Tanzania Breweries Limited (TBL) during the same year. The delay was due to the necessary background operational preparations that were inevitable such as training of brokers and formulation of issuance and trading rules.

Demutualisation
On 29 June 2015 the Dar-es-Salaam Stock exchange re-registered to become a public limited company. The company changed its name from  the Dar Es Salaam Stock Exchange Limited to Dar Es Salaam Stock Exchange Public Limited Company. The company began selling shares on 16 May 2016 and is the third exchange in Africa after Johannesburg Stock Exchange (2006) and Nairobi Securities Exchange (2014) to self list. The company offered 30% of the company's stock on the stock exchange represented by 15,000,000 ordinary shares.

Corporate affairs

Business trends
The Dar-es-salaam stock exchange started its 5-year plan from June 2011. The financial year for the DSE used to begins 1 July and ends on 30 June. This was modified in 2017 to follow the callendar year.

Ownership
As of December 2019, the company stock was owned by corporate entities and individuals. The largest shareholders are listed in the table below.

Services
DSE Mobile Trading was launched on 20 August 2015 to allow people upcountry where brokers are not present. The platform is called "soko la hisa kiganjani". The platform was designed by Maxcom Africa and is compatible with all Tanzanian cell phone operators. The program aims to allow more Tanzanians to participate in the bourse as currently only 400,000 people participate in a country of 50 million. At the end of 2015 over 1000 investors used the platform. The platform continues to gain popularity and at the end of quarter 1 of 2016 the total number of users using the Mobile trading platform increased to 3000.

Market listing
 there are 27 listed companies, five corporate bonds and eight government bonds. The table below summarises the current market listings:

 Main Exchange

East African Breweries and Kenya Airways are crosslisted at both the Uganda Securities Exchange and the Nairobi Securities Exchange.
Kenya Commercial Bank Group, Nation Media Group and Uchumi Supermarkets are cross listed on the Nairobi Securities Exchange, the Uganda Securities Exchange and the Rwanda Stock Exchange
National Investments Company (Limited) Tanzania was re-listed on 3 June 2018 after it was delisted in 2011. The company originally listed on 15 July 2008.

 Enterprise Growth Market (EGM)

See also
Tanzania Mercantile Exchange
Economy of Tanzania
List of stock exchanges
List of African stock exchanges
Stock exchanges of small economies

References

External links
Dar es Salaam Stock Exchange Homepage
African Securities Exchanges Association

Stock exchanges in Africa
Companies of Tanzania
Economy of Dar es Salaam
Financial services companies established in 1996
1996 establishments in Tanzania